Amazon Redshift is a data warehouse product which forms part of the larger cloud-computing platform Amazon Web Services. It is built on top of technology from the massive parallel processing (MPP) data warehouse company ParAccel (later acquired by Actian), to handle large scale data sets and database migrations. Redshift differs from Amazon's other hosted database offering, Amazon RDS, in its ability to handle analytic workloads on big data data sets stored by a column-oriented DBMS principle. Redshift allows up to 16 petabytes of data on a cluster compared to Amazon RDS Aurora's maximum size of 128 terabytes.

Amazon Redshift is based on an older version of PostgreSQL 8.0.2, and Redshift has made changes to that version. An initial preview beta was released in November 2012 and a full release was made available on February 15, 2013. The service can handle connections from most other applications using ODBC and JDBC connections.
According to Cloud Data Warehouse report published by Forrester in Q4 2018, Amazon Redshift has the largest number of Cloud data warehouse deployments, with more than 6,500 deployments.

Redshift uses parallel-processing and compression to decrease command execution time. This allows Redshift to perform operations on billions of rows at once. This also makes Redshift useful for storing and analyzing large quantities of data from logs or live feeds through a source such as Amazon Kinesis Data Firehose.

Amazon has listed a number of business intelligence software proprietors as partners and tested tools in their "APN Partner" program, including Actian, Actuate Corporation, Alteryx, Dundas Data Visualization, IBM Cognos, InetSoft, Infor, Logi Analytics, Looker, MicroStrategy, Pentaho, Qlik, SiSense, Tableau Software, and  Yellowfin. Partner companies providing data integration tools include Informatica and SnapLogic. System integration and consulting partners include Accenture, Deloitte, Capgemini and DXC Technology.

The "Red" in Redshift's name alludes to Oracle, a competing computer technology company sometimes informally referred to as "Big Red" due to its red corporate color. Hence, customers choosing to move their databases from Oracle to Redshift would be "shifting" from "Red".

See also 
Amazon Aurora
Amazon DynamoDB
Amazon Relational Database Service

References

External links 
 
 Amazon Redshift Research Project

Redshift
Data warehousing products
Cloud databases
PostgreSQL
Computer-related introductions in 2012